The 2015–16 Lietuvos krepšinio lyga was the 23rd season of the top-tier level professional basketball league of Lithuania, the Lietuvos krepšinio lyga (LKL). The regular season started on 30 September 2015.

Žalgiris was the defending champion.

Competition format 
During the regular season, all teams played 36 games. The top eight teams, after playing the whole 40 games, each joined the playoffs, in the quarterfinals, that were played in a best-of-three games format. The semifinals were also played in this format.

The final round was played between the two winners of the semifinals. The final series for the first place was played in a best-of-seven format, while the series for the third place was played in a best-of-five format.

Teams

League table

Results

Rounds 1 and 2

Rounds 3 and 4

Attendances
Attendances include playoff games:

Playoffs
Seeded teams play at home games 1, 3, 5 and 7.

Sponsors

Clubs in European competitions

References

External links
 LKL website

 
Lietuvos krepšinio lyga seasons
Lithuanian
LKL